Rhizocybe is a mushroom genus in the family Tricholomataceae in the broad sense. The species resemble Clitocybe and grow amongst litter in forests that are predominantly coniferous.

Etymology

The name Rhizocybe is derived from ancient Greek rhizo referring to its rhizoids, and '-cybe', a reference to head or cap.

See also
List of Agaricales genera

References

Agaricales genera